George Reade (1687 – 28 March 1756), of Shipton-under-Wychwood, Oxfordshire, was a British Army officer and Whig politician who sat in the House of Commons from 1722 to 1734.
 
Reade was the fourth son of Sir Edward Reade, 2nd Baronet. He entered the Army in 1703 as a lieutenant in the 1st Regiment of Foot Guards, ranking as a captain in the Army. He served several campaigns in the wars of Queen Anne, and was promoted to captain-lieutenant (with the rank of lieutenant-colonel in the Army) in 1708 and captain in 1709.

Reade unsuccessfully stood for election as Member of Parliament for Tewkesbury at a by-election in 1721, but was returned at the general election in 1722 and re-elected without opposition in 1727 He consistently supported the Government. King George II promoted him to the commission of second major of the 1st Foot Guards (with the rank of colonel in the Army) in 1729, and in 1733 appointed him to the colonelcy of the 29th Regiment of Foot. He did not stand at the 1734 British general election. On 28 August 1739 he was removed to the 9th Regiment of Foot. In 1743 he was promoted to the rank of major-general, and to that of lieutenant-general in 1747. In 1749 he was removed to the 9th Regiment of Dragoons, holding that colonelcy to his death.

Reade married Jane Now(es), daughter of Charles Now(es), barrister, of Wood Ditton, Cambridgeshire in 1744.  He died on 28 March 1756, without issue.

References
 Richard Cannon, Historical Record of the Ninth, or the East Norfolk Regiment of Foot (1848) page 121.
 Shirley Matthews, READE, George (1687-1756), of Shipton-under-Wychwood, Oxon. in The History of Parliament: the House of Commons 1715-1754 (1970).
 Shirley Matthews, Tewkesbury in The History of Parliament: the House of Commons 1715-1754 (1970).

1687 births
1756 deaths
Younger sons of baronets
British MPs 1722–1727
British MPs 1727–1734
British Army generals
9th Queen's Royal Lancers officers
Grenadier Guards officers
Royal Norfolk Regiment officers
29th Regiment of Foot officers
British military personnel of the War of the Spanish Succession
Members of the Parliament of Great Britain for English constituencies